Krishnasamy Subramaniyam (20 April 1904 – 7 April 1971) was an Indian film director of the 1930s and 1940s. Dancer Padma Subrahmanyam is his daughter.

Biography
Subramanyam was involved in the establishment of the Tamil film industry. He was born in a Brahmin family. He started his film career as a scenarist and producer, working on P. K. Raja Sandow's silent films such as Peyum Pennum. He started Meenakshi Cineton with Alagappa Chettiar, directing his first film Pavalakkodi, in which the Tamil film star M. K. Thyagaraja Bhagavathar debuted. He made a shift with the politically emphatic Balayogini, criticizing the caste system prevalent then.

In 1938, he made Sevasadanam, advocating a better deal for women, the saint film Bhaktha Chetha, critiquing untouchability and the war effort film Maanasamrakshanam. His best-known work is Thyaga Bhoomi. Thyaga Bhoomi was a novel by Kalki Krishnamurthy, which was banned by the British government. He also directed the Malayalam film Prahlada (1941), which was scripted by noted playwright N. P. Chellappan Nair. He was one of the founders of Nadigar Sangam in 1952.

Filmography

 Pavalakkodi (1934)
 Naveena Sadaram (1935)
 Naveena Sarangadhara (1936)
 Kuchela (1936)
 Usha Kalyanam (1936)
 Balayogini (1937)
 Mr. Ammanchi (1937)
 Kowsalya Parinayam (1937)
 Sevasadanam (1938)
 Thyaga Bhoomi (1939)
 Bhaktha Chetha (1940)
 Prahlada (1941) (Malayalam)
 Ananthasayanam (1942)
 Barthruhari (1944)
 Maanasamrakshanam (1945)
 Vikatayogi (1946)
 Vichitra Vanitha (1947)
 Kapati Arakshakaya (1948) (Sinhalese)
 Gokuladasi (1948)
 Geetha Gandhi (1949)

References

External links

 - A rare song sung by Subrahmanyam from the film Ananthasayanam (1942)

Film directors from Tamil Nadu
Tamil film directors
Tamil-language film directors
Malayalam film directors
1904 births
1971 deaths
People from Thanjavur district
20th-century Indian film directors
Odia film directors